Boneh-ye Pir (also Romanized as Boneh-ye Pīr and Boneh Pīr; also known as Bān Pīr) is a village in Bibi Hakimeh Rural District, in the Central District of Gachsaran County, Kohgiluyeh and Boyer-Ahmad Province, Iran. At the 2006 census, its population was 156, in 39 families.

References 

Populated places in Gachsaran County